Lisa Kristine Hilton is an American jazz pianist, bandleader, producer, and composer based in Southern California. Her compositions blend jazz and blues with minimalism, classical, and avant-garde music. Since the early 2000s she has recorded with Antonio Sánchez, Larry Grenadier, Christian McBride, Luques Curtis, J. D. Allen, Rudy Royston, and Sean Jones.

Early years 
Hilton was born in San Luis Obispo, a small town on California's central coast. Her father was a college professor and her mother was an accountant. At approximately the age of six, she began playing piano, first teaching herself to play with a colored keyboard guide and composing simple songs. Later she was inspired by stories of her great uncle, Dutch pianist Willem Bloemendaal. Although her early years were dominated by classical music and 20th-century music study, in her teens she became interested in jazz and blues. Seeing the blues duo Sonny Terry and Brownie McGhee in concert had a lasting impact, as did the music of Jelly Roll Morton, Robert Johnson, and Muddy Waters. She played piano for her grammar school glee club starting in third grade, later joining orchestra and band on flute, and performed piano scores for high school musicals.

Hilton moved to San Francisco. As a college student who studied art, she put music aside to complete a degree in art and design. After returning to music, she was drawn to jazz. She often mentions that she draws on her background in art to create compositions, painting and sculpting her compositions with ideas from music.

Return to the piano 
In 1997, Hilton's interest in music was reignited by a neighbor, pianist David Foster. She resumed her studies in theory and composition with composer Charles Bernstein at UCLA. Her first album, Seduction (1997), was just solo piano which Hilton also produced. Since then she has produced and recorded about one album a year. The albums include cover tunes by musicians such as Janis Joplin, Joni Mitchell, and Ann Ronell.

Hilton began working in 2005 with the multi-Grammy Award-winning engineer Al Schmitt and they continued working together until his passing in 2021.  Hilton has also worked with renowned engineers Doug Sax, Gavin Lurssen, Fernando Lodeiro, Larry Mah, James Farber, Chandler Harrod, Eric Boulanger and Jay Newland, recording 300 tracks of original compositions as well as jazz covers. Hilton has been a voting member of the Producers and Engineers Wing of the National Academy of Recording Arts and Sciences (NARAS) since 2003.

Compositions 
Hilton has received acclaim for her compositions. She cites Thelonious Monk, Duke Ellington, Miles Davis, and Horace Silver as her most important compositional influences. Hilton uses improvisation, free jazz, and shifting modal key centers for impressionistic compositions like "When it Rains." She use ideas from other art forms. "French composers like Debussy used harmonic 'impressionism,' but I like to use improvisational ideas in an impressionistic way," she told Phil Freeman of Burning Ambulance. "Seurat's pointillism technique is something I have applied to music, for example." "Music feels like my first language," she added. "It feels like I can create an experience compositionally that allows others to also feel that experience, much like a good writer being able to describe love, or a painter or photographer creating an image. I think I can compose and play the sound of twilight, of a warm summer's day, of love or grief, of a subway or dolphins even. I think of my – and our – music as abstract or non-figurative paintings." Hilton ventures into longer musical forms, fusing jazz onto classical forms, as in "Midnight Sonata" from her album Nocturnal. On Escapism her arrangements paired modern jazz modalities and classical techniques with a "lofty sophistication reminiscent of classic piano music from Beethoven, Chopin, or Stravinsky.".

In a DownBeat Magazine interview, writer Cree McCree commented Hilton's music "is very ephemeral, like the last couple of years have been."

Later life and career 
As a bandleader, Hilton has worked with bassists Christian McBride, Luques Curtis, and Larry Grenadier, drummers Antonio Sanchez, Nasheet Waits, Rudy Royston, Billy Hart, and Lewis Nash, trumpeters Sean Jones and Terrell Stafford, and saxophonists J. D. Allen, Steve Wilson, Brice Winston, and Bobby Militello. On her latest album, Paradise Cove, her line-up included Obed Cavalaire, Ingmar Thomas, and her long-time bassist Luques Curtis.

In the book The New Face of Jazz, author Cicily Janus writes that Hilton has been "compared to some of the best pianists in history" – comparisons often include Bill Evans and Dave Brubeck, but Hilton's compositions are also considered to be reminiscent of musical impressionism inspired by Claude Debussy and Erik Satie.

On All About Jazz, Hilton's album Transparent Sky was included in a roundup of the Best Recordings of 2021.

In 1988, Price Stern Sloan published the children's book, If Dinosaurs Were Alive Today, which Hilton wrote with her sister, Sandra L. Kirkpatrick, and illustrated by Randy Chewning.

Publishing 
Inspired by Joni Mitchell, Hilton started a publishing company that was trademarked Lisa Hilton Music. Her record label, Ruby Slippers Productions was established in 2001. She is a voting member of National Music Publishers Association.

Inspiration 
For over twenty years, Hilton has lived in Malibu, California. She has often said that the mountains, waterfalls, and beaches inspire her compositions, such as "The Sky and the Ocean" from Horizons. The daughter of a biology professor, she values nature and brings it into her compositions, as in the titles "Vapors & Shadows" from Oasis, "Mojave Moon" from Escapism, and "Sunset on the Beach" from Day and Night.

Philanthropy 
Hilton supports music programs for children and teens, particularly the blind or visually impaired. She has performed benefit concerts, conducted workshops, and played with young musicians at Perkins School for the Blind, Chicago Lighthouse Junior Blind of America and their Camp Bloomfield in Malibu, and the Adaptive Technology Lab at Berklee College of Music in Boston.

Discography 
 Seduction (Ruby Slippers Productions, 1997)
 Playing by Heart (Ruby Slippers Productions, 1999)
 Cocktails at Eight... (Ruby Slippers Productions, 2000)
 Feeling Good (Ruby Slippers Productions, 2001)
 In the Mood for Jazz (Ruby Slippers Productions, 2003)
 Jazz After Hours (Ruby Slippers Productions, 2004)
 My Favorite Things (Ruby Slippers Productions, 2005)
 Midnight in Manhattan (Ruby Slippers Productions, 2006)
 After Dark (EvoSound, 2007)
 The New York Sessions (Ruby Slippers Productions, 2007)
 So This Is Love (EvoSound, 2008)
 Sunny Day Theory (Ruby Slippers Productions, 2008)
 Twilight & Blues (Ruby Slippers Productions, 2009)
 Nuance (Ruby Slippers Productions, 2010)
 Underground (Ruby Slippers Productions, 2011)
 American Impressions (Ruby Slippers Productions, 2012)
 Getaway (Ruby Slippers Productions, 2013)
 Kaleidoscope (Ruby Slippers Productions, 2014)
 Horizons (Ruby Slippers Productions, 2015)
 Nocturnal (Ruby Slippers Productions, 2016)
 Day & Night (Ruby Slippers Productions, 2016)
 Escapism (Ruby Slippers Productions, 2017)
 Oasis (Ruby Slippers Productions, 2018)
 Chalkboard Destiny (Ruby Slippers Productions, 2019)
 More Than Another Day (Ruby Slippers Productions, 2020)
 Transparent Sky (Ruby Slippers Productions, 2021)
 life is beautiful (Ruby Slippers Productions, 2022)
 Paradise Cove (Ruby Slippers Productions, 2022)

Compilations
Jazz Bar 2014 (Terasima Records, Japan, 2014)
Jazz Bar 2021 (Terasima Records, Japan, 2021)

References

External links 
 Official website
 Ruby Slippers Productions - record label / publishing company
 Lisa Hilton ISNI ISO Certified database entry
 Lisa Hilton Feature - Buffalo News
 WHRB Interview by Jazz Spectrum writer Aarya A. Kaushik
 Oasis and Ruby Slippers Productions Review - All About Jazz
 Life is Beautiful The Big Takeover review
 Life Is Beautiful All About Jazz review
 Paradise Cove All About Jazz review

People from San Luis Obispo, California
People from Malibu, California
American women composers
Women jazz composers
Women jazz pianists
American women jazz musicians
21st-century jazz composers
Cool jazz pianists
West Coast jazz pianists
Music publishing companies of the United States
American jazz pianists
American jazz composers
Living people
Year of birth missing (living people)
21st-century American pianists
21st-century American women pianists
21st-century women composers
Jazz musicians from California